Javorje pri Gabrovki is a settlement northwest of Gabrovka in the Municipality of Litija in central Slovenia. The area is part of the traditional region of Lower Carniola. It is now included with the rest of the municipality in the Central Sava Statistical Region; until January 2014 the municipality was part of the Central Slovenia Statistical Region.

Name
The name of the settlement was changed from Javorje to Javorje pri Gabrovki in 1953.

Church
The local church is dedicated to Saint Bartholomew and  belongs to the Parish of Gabrovka. It was first mentioned in written documents dating to 1373, but was rebuilt a number of times over the centuries.

References

External links
Javorje pri Gabrovki on Geopedia

Populated places in the Municipality of Litija